This page is a list of power stations in Taiwan and the rest of the Republic of China that are publicly or privately owned. Non-renewable power stations are those that run on coal, fuel oils, nuclear power, and natural gas, while renewable power stations run on fuel sources such as biomass, geothermal heat, moving water, solar rays, tides, waves and the wind. By the end of 2011, Taiwan and the rest of the Republic of China had installed 41,401 MW of generating capacity across all types of power station.

Among the lists of largest power stations, Taichung Power Plant is the fourth largest coal-fired power station in the world.

Non-renewable

Coal

Diesel

Fuel oil

Mixed

Natural gas

Nuclear

Renewable

Hydroelectric

Geothermal

Former power plants

Figures

Nuclear power plants

Coal-fired power plants

Diesel power plants

Gas-fired power plants

Hydro power plants

Oil-fired power plants

Mixed power plants

Former power plants

See also 

 Energy in Taiwan
 Taiwan Power Company
 Electricity sector in Taiwan
 List of largest power stations in the world

References

 
Taiwan
Power stations